Filet may refer to:

Filet, Switzerland
Fillet (cut), a piece of meat or fish
Filet lace

See also
 Fillet (disambiguation)
 Philae, an island in Lake Nasser, Egypt
 Philae (spacecraft), a robotic lander